Nadia Petrova and Meghann Shaughnessy were the defending champions, but had different outcomes. While Petrova decided to focus only on the singles tournament, Shaughnessy partnered with Anna-Lena Grönefeld and lost in semifinals to Maria Kirilenko and Anabel Medina Garrigues.

Cara Black and Liezel Huber won the title, defeating Kirilenko and Medina Garrigues 6–0, 4–6, 6–1 in the final.

Seeds
The first four seeds received a bye into the second round.

Draw

Finals

Top half

Bottom half

External links
 Main and Qualifying Rounds

Women's Doubles
Italian Open - Doubles